Rimfaxe is the fourth album by the Finnish group Gjallarhorn and was released in 2006.

Reception
Allmusic awarded the album with 3 stars and its review by Chris Nickson States: "Throughout, the traditional material is superb, drawing sometimes on the tradition of the Swedes in Finland, but casting its net all across the Nordic countries. Their sound is unique, a curious mix of instruments that work well together, and there's an obvious reverence for the music they're playing."

Track listing
 "Rimfaxe (Rimemane)"  — 4:00
 "Kokkovirsi (Bonfire Song)"  — 3:28
 "Systrarna (The Sisters)"  — 6:11
 "Blacken [Grey & Frost Club Mix]"  — 6:25
 "Hymn (Hymn)"  — 6:59
 "Sylvklar (Silverbright)"  — 5:04
 "Norafjelds (Mountain Poem)"  — 6:56
 "Ivall (@ley)"  — 4:46
 "Taklax 1037"  — 2:59
 "Taklax 1034"  — 3:36
 "Staffan (Stephen)"  — 4:48
 "Graning (Dawn)"  — 3:38

Personnel
Jenny Wilhelms - vocals, fiddle
Adrian Jones - viola, mandola
Peter Berndalen - percussion  
Göran Månsson - subcontra bass recorder

References 

2006 albums
Gjallarhorn albums